Wellstead is a small rural town situated in Western Australia in the Great Southern region between Albany and Esperance.

The name commemorates the Wellstead family who settled in the area in 1860 and had held grazing land between Cape Riche and Bremer Bay.
Farmland was opened up in the area in the 1960s for cereal cropping and land was set aside for a town site. The town site was gazetted in 1965 shortly after establishing a telephone exchange.

John Wellstead still lived in the area in 1881 and sold 700 head of cattle via the market in Albany early the same year. He died in Albany in 1896 but his sons, including John Jr., continued the family pastoral interests in the area.

The surrounding areas produce wheat and other cereal crops. The town is a receival site for Cooperative Bulk Handling.

References 

Towns in Western Australia
Great Southern (Western Australia)
Grain receival points of Western Australia